Hannah Stambaugh (born 24 December 1998) is a Japanese professional footballer who plays as a goalkeeper for WE League club Omiya Ardija Ventus.

Club career 
Stambaugh made her WE League debut on 20 September 2021.

References 

WE League players
Living people
1998 births
Japanese women's footballers
Women's association football goalkeepers
Omiya Ardija Ventus players
Association football people from Tokyo
Japanese people of American descent